A WAVE, a WAC and a Marine is an American 1944 musical comedy film directed by Phil Karlson (in his directorial debut) for low-budget Monogram Pictures.

Plot
Sally Eilers runs a talent agency and sets out to put a couple of Broadway stars under contract.  Her bumbling employee signs their understudies instead.

Cast 
 Elyse Knox as Marian
 Ann Gillis as Judy (as Anne Gillis)
 Sally Eilers as Margaret Ames
 Richard Lane as Marty Allen
 Marjorie Woodworth as Eileen
 Ramsay Ames as Betty
 Henny Youngman as O. Henry Brown
 Charles 'Red' Marshall as Red (as 'Red' Marshall)
 Alan Dinehart as R. J., the Producer
 Billy Mack as himself
 Cy Kendall as Mike
 Aileen Pringle as Newswoman
 Jack Mulhall as Bartender
 Mabel Todd as Nurse
 Milt Bronson as himself 
 unbilled players include Mel Blanc, Elvia Allman, and Connie Haines

Production
The film's executive producer was comedian Lou Costello. As a gesture to his father – a diehard movie fan, who used the family's actual last name – Costello was credited as Sebastian Cristillo (his father's name), so the latter could see his own name onscreen. The other listed producer, Edward Sherman, was Costello's manager.

Phil Karlson got to know Lou Costello when worked on Abbott and Costello films at Universal as an assistant. Costello tracked down Karlson and told him he wanted to produce a film with Karlson directing. According to Karlson, Costello asked him what did he want to make, and "I said I don't know. By this time I'm so flabbergasted that I had no idea what I wanted to do. But he put up the money and we decided on the crazy story A Wave, a WAC and a Marine."

Reception
Karlson called the film "probably the worst picture ever made.... It was a nothing picture, but I was lucky because it was for Monogram and they didn't understand how bad it was because they had never made anything that was any good." However it did launch Karlson's directing career.

See also
List of American films of 1944

References

External links 

 

1944 films
1944 musical comedy films
American black-and-white films
American musical comedy films
Films about entertainers
Films directed by Phil Karlson
Films scored by Freddie Rich
Films set in Los Angeles
Films set on the home front during World War II
Monogram Pictures films
1944 directorial debut films
1940s English-language films
1940s American films